Monroe Park is an unincorporated community in New Castle County, Delaware, United States. Monroe Park is located west of the interchange between Delaware Route 100/Delaware Route 141 and Delaware Route 52 in Greenville.

References 

Unincorporated communities in New Castle County, Delaware
Unincorporated communities in Delaware